Kendal is a populated place in the parish of Saint John, Barbados.

This where Inkle and Yarico lived.

See also
 List of cities, towns and villages in Barbados

References

Saint John, Barbados
Populated places in Barbados